Jakarta is the capital and largest city of Indonesia.

Jakarta may also refer to:

Jakarta (band), a Serbian and Yugoslav rock band
Jakarta (DJ), an electronic music band known for the hit "One Desire"
Jakarta (mango), a named mango cultivar from Florida
Jakarta EE, a set of specifications, extending Java SE
Jakarta metropolitan area, the metropolitan area including Jakarta and the satellite cities
Jakarta Project, a software project
Jakarta!, 2012 novel by Christophe Dorigné-Thomson

See also 
 
 
 DKI (disambiguation)